Guardiolo is a group of wines grown and produced in the Italian comune of Guardia Sanframondi, San Lorenzo Maggiore, San Lupo, and Castelvenere in the Province of Benevento.  This is a hilly farming region with small streams.  There are both white and red varieties of Guardiolo.  It has been awarded Denominazione di Origine Controllata (DOC) status.

External links
 La Guardiense winery

Italian DOC